The men's 2004 European Amateur Boxing Championships were held in Pula, Croatia, from February 19 to February 29. The 35th edition of thi bi-annual competition was organised by the European governing body for amateur boxing, EABA. A total number of 292 fighters from 41 countries competed at these championships. Russia's Gaydarbek Gaydarbekov afterwards received the Best Fighter Award. The tournament served as a qualification event for the 2004 Summer Olympics in Athens, Greece. All medal winners earned a berth for the Athens Games.

Medal winners

Medal table

See also
1st AIBA European 2004 Olympic Qualifying Tournament 
2nd AIBA European 2004 Olympic Qualifying Tournament 
3rd AIBA European 2004 Olympic Qualifying Tournament 
4th AIBA European 2004 Olympic Qualifying Tournament

External links
Results
EABA Boxing

E
European Amateur Boxing Championships
B
February 2004 sports events in Europe
Boxing in Croatia
Sport in Pula